Homophyton is a genus of corals in the family Spongiodermidae. This genus is found only off the coast of southern Africa.

Species
There are two species in the genus:
Homophyton verrucosum (Möbius, 1861)
Homophyton vickersi (Benham, 1928)

References

Spongiodermidae
Octocorallia genera